Slavíček is a Czech surname:
 Antonín Slavíček (1870–1910), a renowned Czech painter
 Karel Slavíček (1678–1735), a Czech Jesuit missionary and scientist, sinologist

See also
 
 Slavík, Slavik
 Sławik

Czech-language surnames